The Abbasi ministry was formed by Shahid Khaqan Abbasi on 4 August 2017 to begin a new government following the disqualification  of former Prime Minister of Pakistan Nawaz Sharif until the end of May 2018 when justice Nasirul Mulk took oath as new caretaker prime minister. The ministry, a Pakistan Muslim League (N) majority government, succeeded the third Sharif ministry, which was formed following the 2013 general election and had dissolved in the July 2017 after  Nawaz Sharif was disqualification by the Supreme Court of Pakistan to hold the office of Prime Minister.

Cabinet

References

2017 establishments in Pakistan
Pakistan Muslim League (N)
Cabinets established in 2017
2010s in Pakistan
2010s in politics